KACE (98.3 FM) is a radio station licensed to serve the community of Beatty, Nevada. The station is owned by Smith and Fitzgerald, Partnership, and airs a country music format.

The station was assigned the KACE call letters by the Federal Communications Commission on November 21, 2013.

References

External links
 Official Website
 FCC Public Inspection File for KACE
 

ACE (FM)
Radio stations established in 2014
2014 establishments in Nevada
Country radio stations in the United States
Nye County, Nevada